, also known as Girl Diver and Octopi, Diver and Two Octopi, etc., is a woodblock-printed design by the Japanese artist Hokusai. Playing with themes popular in Japanese art, it depicts a young  diver entwined sexually with a pair of octopuses.

History and description
The larger of the two mollusks performs cunnilingus on her, while the smaller one, his offspring, assists by fondling the woman's mouth and left nipple. In the text above the image the woman and the creatures express their mutual sexual pleasure from the encounter.

Richard Douglas Lane calls it Girl Diver and Octopi; Matthi Forrer calls it Pearl Diver and Two Octopi; and Danielle Talerico calls it Diver and Two Octopi. The open book measures .

Text on the print 
The full text that surrounds depicted a maiden and octopuses, translated by James Heaton and Toyoshima Mizuho:

Interpretations

Scholar Danielle Talerico notes that the image would have recalled to the minds of contemporary viewers the story of Princess Tamatori, highly popular in the Edo period. In this story, Tamatori is a modest shell diver who marries Fujiwara no Fuhito of the Fujiwara clan, who is searching for a pearl stolen from his family by Ryūjin, the dragon god of the sea. Vowing to help, Tamatori dives down to Ryūjin's undersea palace of Ryūgū-jō, and is pursued by the god and his army of sea creatures, including octopuses. She cuts open her own breast and places the jewel inside; this allows her to swim faster and escape, but she dies from her wound soon after reaching the surface.

The Tamatori story was a popular subject in ukiyo-e art. The artist, Utagawa Kuniyoshi, produced works based on it, which often include octopuses among the creatures being evaded by the bare-breasted diver. In the text above Hokusai's image, the big octopus says he will bring the girl to Ryūjin's undersea palace, strengthening the connection to the Tamatori legend. The Dream of the Fisherman's Wife is not the only work of Edo-period art to depict erotic relations between a woman and an octopus. Some early  carvings show cephalopods fondling nude women. Hokusai's contemporary Yanagawa Shigenobu created an image of a woman receiving cunnilingus from an octopus very similar to Hokusai's in his collection  of 1830.

Talerico notes that earlier Western critics such as Edmond de Goncourt and Jack Hillier interpreted the work as a rape scene. She notes that these scholars would have seen it apart from the  collection and without understanding the text and visual references, depriving it of its original context. Goncourt did, however, know its original context, which he describes in a passage of his monograph on Hokusai. According to Chris Uhlenbeck and Margarita Winkel, "[t]his print is testimony to how our interpretation of an image can be distorted when seen in isolation and without understanding the text."

Influence
The image is often cited as a forerunner of tentacle erotica, a motif that has been popular in modern Japanese animation and manga since the late 20th century, popularized by author Toshio Maeda. Modern tentacle erotica similarly depicts sex between women and tentacled beasts; the sex in modern depictions is typically forced, as opposed to Hokusai's mutually pleasurable interaction. Psychologist and critic Jerry S. Piven is skeptical that Hokusai's playful image could account for the violent depictions in modern media, arguing that these are instead a product of the turmoil experienced throughout Japanese society following World War II, which was in turn reflective of existing, underlying currents of cultural trauma. Scholar Holger Briel argues that "only in a society that already has a predilection for monsters and is used to interacting with octopods such images might arise", citing Hokusai's print an early exemplar of such a tradition.

The work influenced later artists such as Félicien Rops, Auguste Rodin, Louis Aucoc, Fernand Khnopff and Pablo Picasso. Picasso drew his own private version in 1903, which was displayed in a 2009 Museu Picasso exhibit titled Secret Images, alongside 26 other drawings and engravings by Picasso, displayed next to Hokusai's original and 16 other Japanese prints, portraying the influence of 19th century Japanese art on Picasso's work. Picasso also later fully painted works that were directly influenced by the woodblock print, such as 1932's Reclining Nude, where the woman in pleasure is also the octopus, capable of pleasuring herself. In 2003, a derivative work by Australian painter David Laity, titled The Dream of the Fisherman's Wife, sparked a minor obscenity controversy when it was shown at a gallery in Melbourne; after receiving complaints, police investigated and decided it did not break the city's anti-pornography laws. Hokusai's print has had a wide influence on the modern Japanese-American artist Masami Teraoka, who has created images of women, including a recurring "pearl diver" character, being pleasured by cephalopods as a symbol of female sexual power.

The so-called  ("Octopus aria")  in Pietro Mascagni's opera Iris (1898), on a libretto by Luigi Illica, may have been inspired by this print. The main character Iris describes a screen she had seen in a Buddhist temple when she was a child, depicting an octopus coiling its limbs around a smiling young woman and killing her. She recalls a Buddhist priest explaining: "That octopus is Pleasure... That octopus is Death!"

The scene is recreated in a "surreal, slightly horrific form" in Kaneto Shindo's 1981 fictionalized Hokusai biopic Edo Porn. The print is featured briefly in Park Chan-wook's film The Handmaiden and is intended to illustrate the perverted nature of Uncle Kouzuki's oppression of Lady Hideko to Sook-Hee. The print is given more air time in several episodes of the television series Mad Men, first on the office wall of a senior CEO, perhaps as a symbol of "monstrous alpha male power; the print is given to Peggy Olson by Roger Sterling, Jr. near the series' end. Olson decides to hang the print in her office, part of the culmination of her storyline of becoming comfortable as an executive.

The print has been cited by Isabel Coixet as influential in a sexual scene in her film Elisa & Marcela, as a "non-masculine sexual reference".

References

Bibliography
 
  Retrieved 9 November 2010.
 
 Forrer, Mathi (1992). Hokusai: Prints and Drawings.

External links

1814 paintings
Animals in art
Fictional octopuses
Shunga
Works by Hokusai
Zoophilia in culture